The Royal Netherlands East Indies Army (KNIL) was the military force maintained by the Kingdom of the Netherlands in its colony of the Dutch East Indies, in areas that are now part of Indonesia. The KNIL's air arm was the Royal Netherlands East Indies Army Air Force. Elements of the Royal Netherlands Navy and  Government Navy were also stationed in the Netherlands East Indies.

History

1814–1942
The KNIL was formed by royal decree on 14 September 1814. It was not part of the Royal Netherlands Army, but a separate military arm specifically formed for service in the Netherlands East Indies. Its establishment coincided with the Dutch drive to expand colonial rule from the 17th century area of control to the far larger territories constituting the Dutch East Indies seventy years later.

The KNIL was involved in many campaigns against indigenous groups in the area including the Padri War (1821–1845), the Java War (1825–1830), crushing the final resistance of Bali inhabitants to colonial rule in 1849, and the prolonged Aceh War (1873–1904). In 1894, Lombok and Karangasem were annexed in response to reports of the local Balinese aristocracy oppressing the native Sasak people. Bali was finally taken under full control with the Dutch intervention in Bali (1906) and the final Dutch intervention in Bali (1908).

In the nineteenth and early twentieth centuries, the KNIL resumed the conquest of the Indonesian archipelago. After 1904 the Netherlands East Indies were considered pacified, with no large-scale armed opposition to Dutch rule until World War II, and the KNIL served a mainly defensive role protecting the Dutch East Indies from the possibility of foreign invasion.

Once the archipelago was considered pacified the KNIL was mainly involved with military policing tasks. To ensure a sizeable European military segment in the KNIL and reduce costly recruitment in Europe, the colonial government introduced obligatory military service for all resident male conscripts in the European legal class in 1917. In 1922 a supplemental legal enactment introduced the creation of the Home Guard for European conscripts older than 32.

World War II

Dutch forces in the Netherlands East Indies were severely weakened by the defeat and occupation of the Netherlands itself, by Nazi Germany, in 1940. The KNIL was cut off from external Dutch assistance, except by Royal Netherlands Navy units. The KNIL, hastily and inadequately, attempted to transform into a modern military force able to protect the Dutch East Indies from foreign invasion. By December 1941, Dutch forces in Indonesia numbered around 85,000 personnel: regular troops consisted of about 1,000 officers and 34,000 enlisted soldiers, of whom 28,000 were indigenous. The remainder were made up of locally organised militia, territorial guard units and civilian auxiliaries. The KNIL air force,  (Royal Netherlands East Indies Air Force; ML-KNIL) numbered 389 planes of all types, but was largely outclassed by superior Japanese planes. The Royal Netherlands Navy Air Service, or MLD, also had significant forces in the NEI.

During the Dutch East Indies campaign of 1941–42, most of the KNIL and other Allied forces were quickly defeated. Most European soldiers, which in practice included all able bodied Indo-European males, were interned by the Japanese as POWs. 25% of the POWs did not survive their internment.

A handful of soldiers, mostly indigenous personnel, mounted guerrilla campaigns against the Japanese. These were usually unknown to, and unassisted by, the Allies until the end of the war.

During early 1942, some KNIL personnel escaped to Australia. Some indigenous personnel were interned in Australia under suspicion of sympathies with the Japanese. The remainder began a long process of re-grouping. In late 1942, a failed attempt to land in East Timor, to reinforce Australian commandos waging a guerrilla campaign ended with the loss of 60 Dutch personnel.

Four "Netherlands East Indies" squadrons (the RAAF-NEI squadrons) were formed from ML-KNIL personnel, under the auspices of the Royal Australian Air Force, with Australian ground staff.

KNIL infantry forces (much like their counterparts in the UK), were augmented by recruitment among Dutch expatriates around the world and by colonial troops from as far away as the Dutch West Indies. During 1944–45, some small units saw action in the New Guinea campaign and Borneo campaign.

Just south of Casino, New South Wales, a camp was established in 1942 for a KNIL Technical Battalion. Upon the declaration of the Indonesian Republic, the Dutch soldiers in that battalion interned and imprisoned  500 of their Indonesian native comrades within the camp. Harsh treatment and penalties were issued out by the Dutch on any independence seeking soldiers. This led to the deaths of two KNIL native soldiers; one was a possible suicide and the other was a protest leader. This brought about condemnation from Australian locals, who forced the Australian authorities to repatriate all the imprisoned soldiers, despite being reluctant to heed earlier requests for assistance.

1945–1950
Following World War II, the KNIL was used in two large military campaigns in 1947 and 1948 to re-establish Dutch control of Indonesia. The KNIL and its Ambonese auxiliaries have been accused of committing war crimes during this "police action". Dutch efforts to re-establish their colony failed and Netherlands recognition of Indonesian sovereignty came on 27 December 1949. On 26 January 1950, elements of the KNIL were involved in an abortive coup in Bandung planned by Raymond Westerling and Sultan Hamid II. The coup failed and only accelerated the dissolution of the federal Republic of the United States of Indonesia.

The KNIL was disbanded by 26 July 1950 with its indigenous personnel being given the option of demobilising or joining the newly formed Indonesian military. However, efforts to integrate former KNIL units were impeded by mutual distrust between the predominantly Ambonese KNIL troops and the Javanese-dominated Republican military, leading to clashes at Makassar in April and the attempted secession of an independent Republic of South Maluku (RMS) in July. These revolts were suppressed by November 1950 and approximately 12,500 Ambonese KNIL personnel and their families opted for temporary resettlement in the Netherlands. Following this, the KNIL ceased to exist but its traditions are maintained by the Regiment Van Heutsz of the modern Royal Netherlands Army. At the time of disbandment the KNIL numbered 65,000, of whom 26,000 were incorporated into the new Indonesian Army. The remainder were either demobilised or transferred to the Royal Netherlands Army.

Recruiting

During its formation, it was stated that the KNIL would include both European and indigenous soldiers. In the beginning the KNIL was equally divided, which meant that half the army consisted of European soldiers, while the other half was made up of indigenous soldiers. However, starting from the late 1830s the ratio between European soldiers and indigenous soldiers went from 1:1 to 1:3. The reason for this was that there were not enough European volunteers to keep up with the recruitment of indigenous soldiers. Besides European volunteers and indigenous recruits the KNIL also recruited foreign mercenaries of several nationalities during the 19th century. During the protracted Aceh War the numbers of European troops were kept to 12,000 but continued Achenese resistance necessitated the deployment of up to 23,000 indigenous soldiers (mainly from Java, Ambon, and Manado). Even slaves of the Ashanti (Ivory Coast and Ghana) were recruited in limited numbers for service in the East Indies (see Belanda Hitam). The ratio of foreign and indigenous troops to those of Dutch origin was reported to be 60% to 40%. After the Aceh War, the enlistment of non-Dutch European troops ceased and the KNIL came to consist of Dutch regulars recruited in the Netherlands itself, Indonesians, Indos (Eurasians), and Dutch colonists living in the East Indies and undertaking their military service.

In 1884 personnel strength was numbered at 13,492 European, 14,982 Indonesian, 96 African (though some sources put the number of Africans much higher ) and at least 1,666 Eurasian recruits. The officer corps was wholly European and was probably close to 1,300. There were also about 1,300 horses. Recruitment was carried out in the Netherlands and Indonesia, with over 1,000 Dutch subjects and 500 foreigners enlisting annually. The foreign troops consisted of Flemish, German, Swiss, and French volunteers. Walloons, Arabs, and nationals of both the United Kingdom and United States were forbidden from serving. Other foreigners who could not prove fluency in either Dutch or German were also not accepted for service.

It was against the law to send Dutch conscripts from the Netherlands to the East Indies but Dutch volunteers continued to enlist for colonial service in the KNIL. In 1890 a Corps Colonial Reserve (Koloniale Reserve) was established in the Netherlands itself to recruit and train these volunteers and to re-integrate them into Dutch society upon the conclusion of their overseas service. On the eve of the Japanese invasion in December 1941, Dutch regular troops in the East Indies consisted of about 1,000 officers and 34,000 men, of whom 28,000 were indigenous. The largest proportion of these "native troops" had always consisted of Javanese and Sundanese soldiers. During the Japanese occupation, most of the Dutch and Ambonese personnel were interned in POW camps.

During the Indonesian National Revolution, the KNIL's officers were still largely Dutch and Eurasians although most of its troops were recruited from predominantly Indonesian Christian ethnicities, particularly Batak, Moluccas, Timor and Manado. Although there were smaller numbers of Javanese, Sundanese, Sumatran and other Muslim troops in Dutch service, these received comparatively lower rates of pay than their Christian counterparts, leading to resentment and distrust. The Dutch sought to take advantage of these ethnic tensions by claiming that the Ambonese would lose their special privileges and pensions under a Javanese-dominated government. As noted above, these factors contributed to clashes between demobilised KNIL units and the Republic of Indonesia's military throughout 1950.

Ranks
Officers

Others

Commanders
 1815-1819 General-major Carl Heinrich Wilhelm Anthing 
 1819-1822   General-major Hendrik Merkus de Kock
 1822-1828   General-major Josephus Jacobus van Geen
 1829-1830   General-major Hendrik Merkus de Kock
 1830-1835   Luitenant-generaal Hubert de Stuers
 1835-1847   General-major Frans David Cochius
 1847-1849   General-major Carel van der Wijck
 1849-1851   Luitenant-generaal Bernhard of Saxe-Weimar-Eisenach
 1851-1854   General-major Gerhardus Bakker
 1854-1858   Luitenant-generaal François de Stuers
 1858-1862   Luitenant-generaal Jan van Swieten
 1862-1865   Luitenant-generaal Charles Pierre Schimpf
 1865-1869   Luitenant-generaal Augustus Johannes Andresen
 1869-1873   Luitenant-generaal Willem Egbert Kroesen
 1873-1875   Luitenant-generaal Nicolaus Whitton
 1875-1879   Luitenant-generaal Gillis Pieter de Neve
 1879-1883   Luitenant-generaal Huibert Gerard Boumeester
 1883-1887   Luitenant-generaal Karel Lodewijk Pfeiffer
 1887-1889   Luitenant-generaal Anthonie Haga
 1889-1893   Luitenant-generaal Theodoor van Zijll de Jong
 1893-1895   Luitenant-generaal Adriaan Gey van Pittius
 1895-1897   Luitenant-generaal Jacobus Augustinus Vetter
 1897-1900   Luitenant-generaal Lammert Swart

See also
 British Indian Army—having a similar function in British India

Notes

References
Citations

Bibliography
 
 Hoofdkwartier Militaire Luchtvaart – Overzicht 1947 (5 pc), Flash Aviation, 2005.

Further reading
 Marc Lohnstein and Adam Hook, Royal Netherlands East Indies Army 1936–42, Men-at-arms series 521, Osprey Publishing, Oxford 2018.

External links

 
 

Royal Netherlands East Indies Army
1830 establishments in the Dutch East Indies
Indonesia
Dutch conquest of Indonesia
Dutch East Indies
Military history of Indonesia
Military history of the Netherlands
Military units and formations disestablished in 1950
Military units and formations established in 1830
Military units and formations of the Cold War
Organisations based in the Netherlands with royal patronage